The Welsh Rugby Union Division Five South East (also called the SWALEC Division Five South East for sponsorship reasons) is a rugby union league in Wales first implemented for the 1995/96 season.

Competition format and sponsorship

Competition
There are 11 clubs in the WRU Division Five South East. During the course of a season (which lasts from September to May) each club plays the others twice, once at their home ground and once at that of their opponents for a total of 20 games for each club, with a total of 110 games in each season. Teams receive four points for a win and two point for a draw, an additional bonus point is awarded to either team if they score four tries or more in a single match. No points are awarded for a loss though the losing team can gain a bonus point for finishing the match within seven points of the winning team. Teams are ranked by total points, then the number of tries scored and then points difference. At the end of each season, the club with the most points is crowned as champion. If points are equal the tries scored then points difference determines the winner. The team who is declared champion at the end of the season is eligible for promotion to the WRU Division Four South. The two lowest placed teams are relegated into the WRU Division Six Central.

Sponsorship 
In 2008 the Welsh Rugby Union announced a new sponsorship deal for the club rugby leagues with SWALEC valued at £1 million (GBP). The initial three year sponsorship was extended at the end of the 2010/11 season, making SWALEC the league sponsors until 2015. The leagues sponsored are the WRU Divisions one through to seven.

 (2002-2005) Lloyds TSB
 (2005-2008) Asda
 (2008-2015) SWALEC

2010/2011 season

League teams
 Canton RFC
 Cefn Coed RFC
 Cilfynydd RFC
 Cowbridge RFC
 Deri RFC
 Dinas Powys RFC
 Ferndale RFC
 Old Illtydians RFC
 Old Penarthians RFC
 Penygraig RFC
 St. Albans RFC
 Wattstown RFC

2009/2010 season

League teams
 Barry RFC
 Blackwood Stars RFC
 Canton RFC
 Cilfynydd RFC
 Cefn Coed RFC
 Cowbridge RFC
 Deri RFC
 Dinas Powys RFC
 Old Penarthians RFC
 Penygraig RFC
 Senghenydd RFC
 St. Albans RFC

League table

2008/2009 season

League teams
 Barry RFC
 Canton RFC
 Cilfynydd RFC
 Cowbridge RFC
 Deri RFC
 Dinas Powys RFC
 Hirwaun RFC
 Old Penarthians RFC
 Penygraig RFC
 Pontyclun RFC
 St. Albans RFC

League table

2007/2008 season

League table
 Canton RFC
 Cowbridge RFC
 Deri RFC
 Dinas Powys RFC
 Ogmore Vale RFC
 Old Penarthians RFC
 Penygraig RFC
 Pontyclun RFC
 Porth Harlequins RFC
 St. Albans RFC
 St. Joseph's RFC

League table

References

7